Nicole Elaine Hudson  (née Mott; born 6 July 1976) is an Australian former women's field hockey player. She was the captain of the Hockeyroos, Australia's national women's team, until her retirement from international hockey in 2009. She made her debut for Australia in 1993 and won gold at the 2000 Sydney Olympics. Her AHL team is the Queensland Scorchers.

At the 2008 Summer Olympics, she scored in Australia's first two games, scoring the second goal in an comeback to win 5–4 against Korea, and a skillful individual effort against Spain. The goal against Spain was her 98th international goal, in her 299th international appearance. Her 99th goal for Australia came against South Africa in the following match. The match was Hudson's 300th appearance for her country, as she became the first woman to play 300 international Hockey matches for Australia.

Sponsorship
Hudson put her name to special editions of the Mazon Black Magic stick, featuring a special black-and-pink colour scheme.

Media work
Following her retirement from international hockey in 2009, Hudson was employed by One HD and Channel Ten for the women's hockey matches at the 2010 Commonwealth Games in Dehli, and appeared on Good News Week in the leadup to the event as a cross-promotion.

References

External links
 

1976 births
Australian female field hockey players
Olympic field hockey players of Australia
Olympic gold medalists for Australia
Field hockey players at the 1998 Commonwealth Games
Field hockey players at the 2002 Commonwealth Games
Field hockey players at the 2006 Commonwealth Games
Field hockey players at the 2000 Summer Olympics
Field hockey players at the 2004 Summer Olympics
Field hockey players at the 2008 Summer Olympics
Living people
Commonwealth Games gold medallists for Australia
Commonwealth Games bronze medallists for Australia
Olympic medalists in field hockey
Medalists at the 2000 Summer Olympics
Commonwealth Games medallists in field hockey
Recipients of the Medal of the Order of Australia
Medallists at the 2002 Commonwealth Games
Medallists at the 2006 Commonwealth Games